Taringa oleica is a species of sea slug, a dorid nudibranch, shell-less marine gastropod mollusks in the family Discodorididae.

Distribution
This marine species occurs off the Canary Islands.

References

 Ortea J., Pérez J. & Llera E. M. (1982). Moluscos opistobranquios recolectados durante el plan de bentos circuncanario. Cuadernos del CRINAS 3: 1-48

External links
 Gofas, S.; Le Renard, J.; Bouchet, P. (2001). Mollusca. in: Costello, M.J. et al. (eds), European Register of Marine Species: a check-list of the marine species in Europe and a bibliography of guides to their identification. Patrimoines Naturels. 50: 180-213

Discodorididae
Gastropods described in 1982